Aequorivita crocea  is a Gram-negative, psychrotolerant, strictly aerobic, rod-shaped, chemoheterotrophic and non-motile bacterium from the genus of Aequorivita which has been isolated from the Antarctic.

References

External links
Type strain of Aequorivita crocea at BacDive -  the Bacterial Diversity Metadatabase

Flavobacteria
Bacteria described in 2002
Psychrophiles